Joseph Germain Mathieu Roubaud, called "Benjamin", (29 May 1811 – 13 January 1847), the son of Mathieu Aubert Roubaud and Rosalie Caillol, was a 19th-century French painter, lithographer and caricaturist.

Biography 
In Paris Roubaud was a student of painter Louis Hersent. From 1833 to 1847, he exhibited at the Salon genre paintings, landscapes, portraits, still lifes in the way of the master, and became a painter of an honorable place. After 1840, he was correspondent in Algiers of the magazine L'Illustration and at the end of his life, treated subjects related to Algeria.

It is as a cartoonist and caricaturist that he showed the fullness of his talent. From 1839 to 1841, he realized for the Galerie de la presse, de la littérature et des arts and the Panthéon charivarique, portraits of personalities among the most influential of the time which now make prominent historical documents (100 boards).

Series published at Aubert 

 Les Annonces (with Philipon), Les Mauvais Locataires, Vie et Aventures de M. Jobard, La Contrebande aux Barrières, Enfantillages ;
 Portraits-Charge for the Miroir drolatique.
 Le Grand chemin de la postérité : 3 series (men of letters, playwrights, novelists, actors), large leaves in width, each comprising two strips of portraits-charges.

Point of view 
"Benjamin Roubaud hardly reaches the comic; just drawing attracts him more; he pencils carefully, with charm; the sake of accuracy gives him a taste of the portrait-charge, which he successfully creates" (Émile Bayard, La Caricature et les caricaturistes, (p. 125).

Bibliography 
 Émile Bayard, La caricature et les caricaturistes, Paris, Delagrave, 1900.
 Bénézit
 
 
 Allgemeines Künstler Lexikon : die bildender Künstler aller Zeiten und Völker, Saur, München, K. G. Saur, 1992.
 John Grand-Carteret, Les Mœurs et la Caricature en France, 1888.

External links 

 Benjamin Roubaud on Plein Chant
 Généalogie Benjamin Roubaud

19th-century French painters
French male painters
19th-century French lithographers
French caricaturists
French editorial cartoonists
1811 births
People from Bouches-du-Rhône
1847 deaths
19th-century French male artists